The Pennsylvania lieutenant gubernatorial election of 1998 was held on November 3, 1998. In Pennsylvania, the Lieutenant Governor is elected on the same ticket as the Governor, so the only campaign for this office was the primary election.

Democratic primary

Candidates
 Marjorie Margolies-Mezvinsky, former US Representative (from Montgomery County)
 Ron Panza, Green Tree Borough Councilor (from Allegheny County)
 Al Penksa, Cambria County Controller

Republican primary
 Mark Schweiker, incumbent Lt. Governor, was unopposed for the nomination.

See also
1998 Pennsylvania gubernatorial election

References

1998
Pennsylvania
1998 Pennsylvania elections